The Pakistan Muslim League (Qayyum), also referred as Qayyum Muslim League (QML) or Muslim League (Qayyum) was a Pakistani political party. After an attempt to neutralize the Pakistan Peoples Party and the Awami League by uniting the PML-Convention and PML-Council, instead, PML-Council leader Sardar Qayyum quit the party and formed his own faction, "Qayyum Muslim League (QML)".

PML-Qayyum fielded 173 candidates for the National Assembly of Pakistan in the 1970 general election and won nine seats whereas the remaining first runner-up won 26 seats. It won one seat at the national level and two in Khyber Pakhtunkhwa in the 1977 elections, which was the last time it won seats. It last ran candidates in the 1993 Pakistani general election.

References

Political parties in Pakistan
Political parties established in 1970
1970 establishments in Pakistan
Muslim League breakaway groups

Political parties disestablished in 1993